RVS III is the fourth studio album by American country music artist Ricky Van Shelton. The singles released from the album were "Statue of a Fool" (#2), "I've Cried My Last Tear for You"(#1), "I Meant Every Word He Said" (#2), and "Life's Little Ups and Downs" (#4). The album was certified platinum by the RIAA on April 8, 1991.

The album includes several covers. "Oh, Pretty Woman" is a cover of Roy Orbison's famous song. "Sweet Memories" was recorded by Willie Nelson in 1979 for his album of the same name. "Statue of a Fool" was a #1 hit for Jack Greene in 1969 and a #10 in 1974 for Brian Collins, and "Life's Little Ups and Downs" was a #41 for Charlie Rich in 1969.

Track listing

Personnel
Eddie Bayers - drums
Barry Beckett - piano
Larry Byrom - acoustic guitar
Mark Casstevens - acoustic guitar
Paul Franklin - steel guitar
Steve Gibson - electric guitar, mandolin
Tommy Hannum - steel guitar
David Hungate - bass guitar on "Sweet Memories"
Roy Huskey, Jr. - upright bass
Brenda Lee - vocals on "Sweet Memories"
Randy McCormick - piano
Joey Miskulin - accordion
Farrell Morris - vibes
Louis Dean Nunley - background vocals
Mark O'Connor - fiddle
Tom Robb - bass guitar
John Wesley Ryles - background vocals
Lisa Silver - background vocals
Ricky Van Shelton - acoustic guitar, lead vocals
Tommy Wells - drums
Bergen White - background vocals
Dennis Wilson - background vocals

Charts

Weekly charts

Year-end charts

Certifications

References

1990 albums
Columbia Records albums
Ricky Van Shelton albums
Albums produced by Steve Buckingham (record producer)